Events from the year 1820 in France.

Incumbents
 Monarch – Louis XVIII
 Prime Minister – Élie, duc Decazes (until 20 February), then Armand-Emmanuel de Vignerot du Plessis, Duc de Richelieu

Events
14 February – Charles Ferdinand d'Artois, Duke of Berry, the nephew of the king is assassinated by a fanatic.  The Prime Minister, Elie Louis, Duke of Decazes and Glücksbierg is held indirectly for the crime by the Ultra-royalists and forced to resign from the government
12 June – Élie Decazes, leader of the opposition in the Chamber of Deputies, successfully introduces the "Law of the Double Vote", a proposal to add to the 258 existing legislators by creating 172 seats that would be "selected by special electoral colleges" made up of the wealthiest 25% of voters in each of France's departments. 
4 November – Legislative election held.
13 November – Legislative election held.
Public gas lighting in Paris.

Births
16 January – Pierre Louis Rouillard, sculptor (died 1881)
20 January – Alexandre-Emile Béguyer de Chancourtois, geologist and mineralogist (died 1886)
20 February – Gustave Nadaud, songwriter and chansonnier (died 1893)
30 April – Edouard Louis Dubufe, painter (died 1883)
11 June – Alexandre Bertrand, archaeologist (died 1902)
17 September – Émile Augier, dramatist (died 1889)
29 September – Henry, Count of Chambord, Legitimist Pretender to the throne of France (died 1883)
24 October – Eugène Fromentin, painter and writer (died 1876)
8 November – Hippolyte Castille, writer (died 1886)

Full date unknown
Antoine-Élisabeth-Cléophas Dareste de la Chavanne, historian (died 1882)
Léon Fairmaire, entomologist (died 1906)
Mathieu Auguste Geffroy, historian (died 1895)
Ernest de Jonquières, mathematician (died 1901)
Léonard Morel-Ladeuil, goldsmith and sculptor (died 1888)
Auguste Sallé, traveller and entomologist (died 1896)

Deaths

January to June
9 January – Charles-Louis Clérisseau, architectural draughtsman, antiquary, and artist (born 1721)
21 January – Palisot de Beauvois, naturalist (born 1752)
15 February – Pierre-Joseph Cambon, statesman (born 1756)
26 March – Jean-Étienne Despréaux, ballet dancer, choreographer, composer, singer and playwright (born 1748)
25 April – Constantin-François Chassebœuf, philosopher, historian, orientalist, and politician (born 1757)
21 June – Alexis Thérèse Petit, physicist (born 1791)

July to December
14 September – François Joseph Lefebvre, Marshal of France (born 1755)
5 October – Augustin Barruel, Jesuit priest and writer (born 1741)
16 November – Jean-Lambert Tallien, political figure (born 1767)
7 December – Denis Decrès, naval officer and nobleman (born 1761)
25 December – Joseph Fouché, statesman and Minister (born 1763)
29 December – Jean Baptiste Antoine Auget de Montyon, philanthropist (born 1733)

Full date unknown
Pierre Denys de Montfort, naturalist (born 1766)
Jean-Baptiste Robinet, naturalist (born 1735)
Jean Simeon Rousseau de la Rottiere, painter (born 1747)

See also

References

1840

1820s in France